Iversky Monastery may refer to:
Valday Iversky Monastery
Iversky Monastery (Donetsk)
Iversky Convent (Rostov-on-Don)